Dorf Clark Industries Limited (commonly Dorf) is a division of GWA International Ltd and is an Australian manufacturer of taps & accessories, stainless sinks and tubs & commercial products. Dorf has a major manufacturing facility in Penrith, New South Wales and has sales offices in across Australia and New Zealand. Dorf also has agents in the Pacific Islands, South East Asia, Canada and the USA.

Caroma Dorf was formed in 2006 by GWA International Limited as the Bathroom Fixtures and Sanitaryware business, which is now home to a number of well-known brands including Dorf, Caroma, Fowler, Irwell, Stylus, Clark, Epure and Radiant.

External links
Official Dorf Clark Industries Limited Website
Air Pro Master - AC, Plumbing & HVAC Repair

Manufacturing companies of Australia
Plumbing materials companies
Kitchenware brands